Leiocephalikon is an extinct genus of microsaur within the family Gymnarthridae. The type species is Amblyodon problematicum named by John William Dawson in 1882.

See also
 Prehistoric amphibian
 List of prehistoric amphibians

Gymnarthrids
Paleozoic life of Nova Scotia